Konstantin Leonidovich Pankov (1910–1942) was an ethnically Nenets/Mansi Soviet painter. Born in the far north in a family of hunters, he started to paint landscapes while never having seen any paintings.  As Gennady Gor wrote, "Pankov's paintings are meditations on his land in terms of color. In the Far North airplanes and self-propelled sledges can be seen side by side with sleds pulled by teams of reindeer. Even in our day, books and TV screens co-exist there with the folklore of times past. Pankov's life reads like a fairy-tale. As a youth he used to ski through his native taiga with a song on his lips. Then the song assumed the shape of paintings and, thus metamorphosed, reached Leningrad and Moscow, and Paris".

Konstantin was born in 1910 in the village Saranpaul which is now in Beryozovsky District, Khanty-Mansi Autonomous Okrug, in the Northern Urals. His father was a Nenets, his mother a Mansi.

He entered the Institute for Peoples of the North in Leningrad. The art studio of the institute was supervised by A. Uspensky and L. Mess. They fully realized how intricate and unusual had been the road traveled by their talented disciple, a primitive hunter only two years before. Pankov and his studio mates had no idea of the long-standing traditions of Western and Russian art before they came to Leningrad, for they had simply never seen a picture.

Perhaps Pankov ought to have been first taken to the Hermitage or the Russian Museum and shown the great masterpieces of Rembrandt and Rubens or Briullov and Alexander Ivanov. Uspensky and Mess did not want to rush things, because Pankov had never seen a picture in his life, except the portraits at the Institute, and might have taken the first masterpiece he saw for an inviolable standard to follow and surrendered his will to somebody else's way of vision.

The traditions of "anonymous" art, folklore, so different from those of the present-day visual arts, are obvious in Pankov's works.

Pankov is unique, for he fuses the folkloristic vision of life and ingenuousness of taiga-born hunter with the modern technique of painting and faultless sense of colour and composition. The high aesthetic merit of the young artist's pictures, their singular and novel character, could not, of course, remain unnoticed. Pictures by Pankov and his studio mates were repeatedly reproduced in many magazines in the thirties. They decorated the Pavilion of the Far North at the All-Union Agricultural Exhibition and the Soviet Pavilion at the Paris Exposition of 1937. Thousands and thousands of Parisians visiting the Soviet Pavilion were deeply impressed by the art of the minor nationalities of the Soviet Far North, to whom the October Revolution had given a new lease of life. The Jury of the Exposition rated the works of the painters of the Far North, notably Pankov, who were awarded the Grand Prix and Gold Medals. The Honorary Diploma of the Exposition conferred upon the Institute for Peoples of the North is kept at the Leningrad Museum of the Arctic.

As soon as World War II began, Konstantin Pankov joined the Red Army as a sniper and scout, making good use of his knowledge of the North. He was fighting on the Volkhov Front in 1942 when he was killed in action.

References
 Konstantin Pankov. Nenets Painter, Gennady Gor, Aurora Art Publishers, Leningrad, 1973

1910 births
1942 deaths
People from Beryozovsky District, Khanty-Mansi Autonomous Okrug
Nenets people
Soviet military snipers
Soviet military personnel killed in World War II
Soviet painters
Mansi people